Nationality words link to articles with information on the nation's poetry or literature (for instance, Irish or France).

Events
 April – Charles Baudelaire leaves Paris for Belgium in the hope of resolving his financial difficulties.

Works published

Canada
 Charles Heavysege:
 The Owl (Montreal)
 The Dark Huntsman (a dream) (Montreal)

United Kingdom
 William Allingham:
 Laurence Bloomfield in Ireland
 Editor, The Ballad Book, anthology
 Robert Browning, Dramatis Personae, including "Rabbi Ben Ezra" and "Caliban upon Setebos"
 Edward Hartley Dewart, Selections from Canadian Poets, the first anthology of Canadian poetry in English
 Robert Lowry, "Beautiful River"
 George MacDonald, Adela Cathcart, fairy tales, parables and poems
 Winthrop Mackworth Praed, Poems, including a memoir by Derwent Coleridge, posthumously published
 William Brighty Rands, anonymously published, Lilliput Levee, for children
 Joseph Skipsey, The Collier Lad and other Lyrics
 Alfred Lord Tennyson, Enoch Arden

United States
 George Henry Baker, Poems of the War
 William Cullen Bryant:
 Thirty Poems
 Hymns
 Laura Redden Searing, Idyls of Battle and Poems of the Rebellion
 Edmund Clarence Stedman, Alice of Monmouth: An Idyll of the Great War and Other Poems
 John Greenleaf Whittier, In War Time, United States

Other
 Aleardo Aleardi, I fuochi sull'Appennibo, Italy
 Alfred de Vigny, Les Destinées, philosophical poems on discipline and social order; posthumously published (died 1863), France

Births
Death years link to the corresponding "[year] in poetry" article:
 April 8 – Orelia Key Bell (died 1959), American
 May 4 – Richard Hovey (died 1900), American
 February 17 – Andrew "Banjo" Paterson (died 1941), Australian writer and poet
 April 30 (April 18 O.S.) – Juhan Liiv (died 1913), Estonian
 August 16 – Mary Gilmore (died 1962), Australian poet and journalist
 September 18 – Itō Sachio 伊藤佐千夫, pen name of Itō Kojirō (died 1913), Japanese, Meiji period tanka poet and novelist (surname: Itō)
 September 29 – Miguel de Unamuno (died 1936), Spanish essayist, novelist, poet, playwright and philosopher
 November 26 – Herman Gorter (died 1927), Dutch poet and socialist
 November 30 – Sydney Jephcott (died 1951), Australian

Deaths
Birth years link to the corresponding "[year] in poetry" article:
 January 13 – Stephen Foster (born 1826), American songwriter
 January 29 – Lucy Aikin (born 1781), English writer
 February 2 – Adelaide Anne Procter (born 1825), English poet, a daughter of poet Bryan Procter
 April 18 – Juris Alunāns (born 1832), Latvian philologist and poet
 May 20 – John Clare (born 1793), English "peasant poet"
 July 4 – Nathaniel Hawthorne (born 1804), American writer
 July 6 – George Pope Morris (born 1802), American editor, poet and songwriter
 September 17 – Walter Savage Landor (born 1775), English writer and poet
 November 3 – Gonçalves Dias (born 1823), Brazilian (shipwreck)

See also

 19th century in poetry
 19th century in literature
 List of years in poetry
 List of years in literature
 Victorian literature
 French literature of the 19th century
 Poetry

Notes

Poetry
19th-century poetry